Steve McIlhone (born 24 May 1969) is a former Scottish professional footballer who played as a forward for Hibernian and East Fife.

Club career

Hibernian
McIlhone started his career at Hibernian in 1986, sharing a dressing room with Hibernian legend Paul Kane.  The forward caught the eye of clubs in England and had trained with Arsenal for a week, but left the Hibees without making a single first team appearance.

East Fife
He had a short spell at the West Lothian club Blackburn United before joining East Fife.  McIlhone made 13 appearances without scoring for the Fifers and was released by then manager Gavin Murray in 1989.

Whitburn
After leaving Fife, McIlhone joined Whitburn for the remainder of his playing career.  He was part of the squad that reached the Scottish Junior Cup final in 1995, but ultimately lost 2–0 to Camelon Juniors.

Coaching career
McIlhone was appointed as Steve Pittman's assistant manager at Broxburn Athletic in 2008.  He was part of the Brox team that won the Scottish Junior Football East Region Premier League South in 2009–2010.  McIlhone stepped down from the position of assistant manager in 2012 due to work commitments.

References

1969 births
Living people
Scottish footballers
Scottish Football League players
Association football forwards
Hibernian F.C. players
East Fife F.C. players
Whitburn Junior F.C. players
Blackburn United F.C. players
Sportspeople from Livingston, West Lothian
Footballers from West Lothian
Broxburn Athletic F.C. non-playing staff